Brzeziniec  is a village in the administrative district of Gmina Mirsk, within Lwówek Śląski County, Lower Silesian Voivodeship, in south-western Poland, close to the Czech border.

During World War II, a German forced labour subcamp of the prison in Jawor was operated in the village.

References

Brzeziniec